The 2014 Minnesota gubernatorial election took place on November 4, 2014, to elect the governor of Minnesota concurrently with the election to Minnesota's Class II U.S. Senate seat, as well as other elections to the United States Senate in other states and elections to the United States House of Representatives and various state and local elections.

Incumbent Democratic–Farmer–Labor governor Mark Dayton ran for re-election to a second term in office. Incumbent Democratic lieutenant governor Yvonne Prettner Solon retired and Tina Smith was selected as his new running mate.

Primary elections were held on August 12, 2014. Dayton and Smith won the Democratic primary and the Republicans nominated Hennepin County Commissioner Jeff Johnson and his running mate former state representative Bill Kuisle. In the general election, Dayton and Smith defeated them and several other minor party candidates with just over 50% of the vote. Dayton's victory broke his own record, set in 2010, as the oldest Minnesota gubernatorial candidate to win an election; he was 67. It was also the first gubernatorial race since 1994 in which the winner received a majority of the votes cast.

The election was the first time since 1994 that a third party did not gain more than 6% of the total vote.

Background
Incumbent Republican Governor Tim Pawlenty declined to run for a third term in 2010, instead running for the Republican presidential nomination in the 2012 election. State Representative Tom Emmer easily won the Republican nomination and former U.S. Senator Mark Dayton won the DFL nomination with a plurality over State House Speaker Margaret Anderson Kelliher. After a very close race, Dayton defeated Emmer by just 8,770 votes, 0.42% of all votes cast.

Dayton's victory was one of just four that Minnesota Democrats have achieved out of 28 gubernatorial elections during a Democratic presidency. Despite this, and despite his narrow margin of victory in 2010, Dayton was not seen as a top Republican target. The Cook Political Report and The Rothenberg Political Report both rate the race as "safe Democratic" and Daily Kos Elections, Governing and Sabato's Crystal Ball all rate the race as "likely Democratic".

Democratic–Farmer–Labor primary

Candidates

Declared
 Bill Dahn
 Running mate: James Vigliotti
 Leslie Davis, activist
 Running mate: Gregor Soderberg
 Mark Dayton, incumbent governor
 Running mate: Tina Smith, Dayton's former chief of staff

Results

Republican primary
Until 2014, Minnesota Republicans had not had a competitive gubernatorial primary since 1924, when Theodore Christianson beat Ole Jacobson by 2.8%, taking 22.8% of the vote in a six-candidate race that saw five candidates finish in double digits. In every election since then, the nominee had won the primary by at least 17.8% and on average by 62.2%.

At the Republican State Convention on May 30–31, 2014, Jeff Johnson received the party's endorsement. Dave A. Thompson withdrew from the race and endorsed Johnson. Scott Honour, Marty Seifert and Kurt Zellers all ran in the August primary, but Johnson prevailed with 30% of the vote.

Candidates

Declared
 Merrill Anderson, former director of Reachout Today Inc and candidate for Mayor of Minneapolis in 2013
 Running mate: Mark D. Anderson, former realtor and housing counselor.
 Scott Honour, investment banker
 Running mate: Karin Housley, state senator
 Jeff Johnson, Hennepin County Commissioner and former state representative
 Running mate: Bill Kuisle, former state representative and farmer
 Marty Seifert, former Minority Leader of the Minnesota House of Representatives and candidate for governor in 2010
 Running mate: Pam Myhra, state representative
 Kurt Zellers, state representative and former Speaker of the Minnesota House of Representatives
 Running mate: Dean Simpson, former state representative

Withdrawn
 Rob Farnsworth, teacher and candidate for Minnesota's 8th congressional district in 2010
 Ole Savior, perennial candidate (ran for the U.S. Senate)
 Dave A. Thompson, state senator and former radio host
 Running mate: Michelle Benson, state senator

Declined
 Kurt Bills, former state representative and nominee for the U.S. Senate in 2012
 Norm Coleman, former U.S. Senator and nominee for governor in 1998
 Matt Dean, state representative and former Majority Leader of the Minnesota House of Representatives
 Keith Downey, chairman of the Republican Party of Minnesota and former state representative
 Tom Emmer, former state representative and nominee for governor in 2010 (running for Congress)
 Bill Guidera, finance chair of the Republican Party of Minnesota
 David Hann, Minority Leader of the Minnesota Senate and candidate for governor in 2010
 Karin Housley, state senator (running for lieutenant governor on Scott Honour's ticket)
 Bill Ingebrigtsen, state senator
 John Kline, U.S. Representative
 John Kriesel, former state representative
 Susan Marvin, businesswoman
 Erik Paulsen, U.S. Representative
 Tim Pawlenty, former governor
 Julie Rosen, state senator
 Ron Schutz, attorney
 Rich Stanek, Hennepin County Sheriff

Polling

Results

Independence primary

The Independence Party of Minnesota state convention was held on May 17, 2014, at Minnesota State University, Mankato.

Candidates

Nominee
 Hannah Nicollet, software developer
 Running mate: Tim Gieseke, businessman and candidate for the state house in 2013

Declined
 Tom Horner, public affairs consultant and nominee for governor in 2010 (endorsed Jeff Johnson)

Results

Libertarian Party
The Libertarian Party of Minnesota state convention was held on April 26, 2014, in Maple Grove.

Candidates

Nominee
 Chris Holbrook
 Running mate: Chris Dock

Grassroots — Legalize Cannabis Party

Candidates

Declared
 Chris Wright, computer repair shop owner and nominee for governor in 1998 and 2010
 Running mate: David Daniels, playwright and performance artist

General election

Debates
Complete video of debate, October 1, 2014 - C-SPAN
Complete video of debate, October 8, 2014 - YouTube
Complete video of debate, October 9, 2014 - YouTube
Complete video of debate, October 14, 2014 - YouTube
Complete video of debate, October 19, 2014 - YouTube

Predictions

Polling

Results

See also
 2014 Minnesota elections

References

External links
 Elections & Voting – Minnesota Secretary of State
 Minnesota gubernatorial election, 2014 at Ballotpedia

Official campaign websites (Archived)
 Leslie Davis
 Mark Dayton
 Rob Farnsworth
 Scott Honour
 Jeff Johnson
 Hannah Nicollet
 Marty Seifert
 Dave Thompson
 Kurt Zellers
 Chris Wright

Gubernatorial
2014
2014 United States gubernatorial elections